The 1994 Duke Blue Devils football team represented the Duke Blue Devils of Duke University during the 1994 NCAA Division I-A football season.

Schedule

References

Duke
Duke Blue Devils football seasons
Duke Blue Devils football